The Capivari River is a river of São Paulo state in southeastern Brazil. It flows into the Represa Capivara, which drains by the (different) Capivara River into the Paranapanema.

See also
List of rivers of São Paulo

References
Brazilian Ministry of Transport

Rivers of São Paulo (state)